Florence Township is a township in Goodhue County, Minnesota, United States.  The population was 1,450 at the 2000 census. A small part of the city of Lake City extends geographically within the township, but is a separate entity. The unincorporated area of Frontenac is also located within the township.

History
Florence Township was organized in 1858, and named for Florence Graham, the daughter of a county judge.

Geography

Major highways
  U.S. Route 61,  U.S. Route 63 (Co-signed throughout the township).

Lakes and streams

Major
 Mississippi River
 Lake Pepin

Minor
 Frontenac Lake
 Sugar Loaf Creek
 Wells Creek

Parks
 Frontenac State Park
 Perched Valley Wildlife Management Area

Demographics
As of the census of 2000, there were 1,450 people, 524 households, and 408 families residing in the township. There were 633 housing units at an average density of 18.1/sq mi (7.0/km2). The racial makeup of the township was 98.76% White, 0.41% African American, 0.41% Native American, 0.28% Asian, and 0.14% from two or more races. Hispanic or Latino of any race were 0.34% of the population.

There were 524 households, out of which 32.1% had children under the age of 18 living with them, 69.5% were married couples living together, 4.4% had a female householder with no husband present, and 22.1% were non-families. 18.1% of all households were made up of individuals, and 6.7% had someone living alone who was 65 years of age or older. The average household size was 2.57 and the average family size was 2.90.

In the township the population was spread out, with 23.5% under the age of 18, 4.6% from 18 to 24, 24.3% from 25 to 44, 29.3% from 45 to 64, and 18.3% who were 65 years of age or older. The median age was 44 years. For every 100 females, there were 93.3 males. For every 100 females age 18 and over, there were 94.9 males.

The median income for a household in the township was $53,971, and the median income for a family was $59,297. Males had a median income of $35,260 versus $26,957 for females. The per capita income for the township was $24,276.  About 2.1% of families and 4.4% of the population were below the poverty line, including 4.8% of those under age 18 and 7.2% of those age 65 or over.

References

Townships in Goodhue County, Minnesota
Townships in Minnesota